The Huntsville meridian begins on the northern boundary of Alabama, in latitude 34° 59′ 27" north, longitude 86° 34′ 16″ west from Greenwich, extends south to latitude 33° 06′ 20″ north, and governs the surveys in the northern district of Alabama.

Within the city of Huntsville, Alabama, Meridian Street coincides with the Huntsville Meridian for most of its length north of US-72. The marker for the Huntsville Meridian is in the Maple Hill Cemetery near downtown Huntsville.

Sources

See also
List of principal and guide meridians and base lines of the United States

References

External links

Meridians and base lines of the United States
Named meridians
Geography of Alabama